Tăriceni may refer to several villages in Romania:

 Tăriceni, a village in Frăsinet Commune, Călărași County
 Tăriceni, a village in Șirna Commune, Prahova County